Newlands/Auldburn (Ward 2) is one of the 23 wards of Glasgow City Council. Situated south of the city and the River Clyde, it is represented by 3 members as of 4 May 2017, one each from the Scottish National Party, Scottish Labour, and Scottish Conservatives.

Boundaries and demographics
The ward covers the areas of Pollokshaws, Newlands, Hillpark, Auldhouse, Merrylee, Cowglen, Kennishead, Eastwood, Mansewood, Carnwadric, Arden and the western part of Muirend, as well as Pollok Country Park.

A 2017 boundary change resulted in the gain of Arden from the Greater Pollok ward, and a minor loss of a few streets in Cathcart to the Langside ward when the boundary was moved south from the White Cart Water to the Cathcart Circle Line railway.

According to the 2011 census, the ethnicity of the population is:

Councillors

Election results

2022 Election
2022 Glasgow City Council election

2017 Election
2017 Glasgow City Council election

2012 Election
2012 Glasgow City Council election

2007 Election
2007 Glasgow City Council election

See also
Wards of Glasgow

References

External links
Listed Buildings in Newlands/Auldburn Ward, Glasgow City at British Listed Buildings

Wards of Glasgow
Pollokshaws